Nea Roumata is the archaeological site of an ancient Minoan tomb near the village of Nea Roumata in Chania regional unit, Crete, Greece.

Archaeology
A small Early Minoan I tholos tomb made of river bed rocks was found at Nea Roumata.  A single body and two vases were excavated.  The tomb is similar to contemporary Cyclades tombs.

References
 Swindale, Ian "Nea Roumata" Retrieved 11 February 2006

Chania (regional unit)
Minoan sites in Crete
Tombs in Greece